The 2014–15 NBL season was the 37th season of competition since its establishment in 1979. A total of eight teams contested the league. The regular season was played between 10 October 2014  and 22 February 2015, followed by a post-season featuring the top four in late February and March 2015.

Australian broadcast rights to the season are held by free-to-air network Channel Ten and its digital sports sister station One, in the final year of a five-year deal. In New Zealand, Sky Sport are the official league broadcaster, in the final year of a three-year deal.

During the off-season the Melbourne Tigers were rebranded as Melbourne United.

Pre-season

Sydney Kings pre-season

Wollongong Hawks pre-season

Cairns Taipans pre-season

Melbourne United pre-season

Adelaide 36ers pre-season

Perth Wildcats pre-season

Townsville Crocodiles pre-season

New Zealand Breakers pre-season

2014 NBL Pre-Season Blitz
A pre-season tournament featuring all eight teams was held on 19–21 September 2014 at NAB Stadium, Brisbane. The winner will receive the second annual Loggins-Bruton Cup.

Townsville Crocodiles are pre-season champions.

Regular season

Round 1

Round 2

Round 3

Round 4

Round 5

Round 6

Round 7

Round 8

Round 9

Round 10

Round 11

Round 12

Round 13

Round 14

Round 15

Round 16

Round 17

Round 18

Round 19

Round 20

Ladder
The Cairns Taipans became the first regional centre team to win the minor premiership since the Geelong Cats did so in 1984.

Finals 

The 2014–15 National Basketball League Finals will be played in February and March 2015, consisting of two best-of-three semi-final and final series, where the higher seed hosts the first and third games.

Playoff Seedings 

 Cairns Taipans
 New Zealand Breakers
 Adelaide 36ers
 Perth Wildcats

The NBL tie-breaker system as outlined in the NBL Rules and Regulations states that in the case of an identical win–loss record, the results in games played between the teams will determine order of seeding.

Playoff bracket

Semi-finals

Grand final

Season statistics

Statistics leaders

Note: regular season only (minimum 14 games) and excluding negligible attempts

Top 10 Attendances

Awards

Player of the Week

Player of the Month

Coach of the Month

Pre-season
 Most Valuable Player (Ray Borner Medal): Mickell Gladness, Townsville Crocodiles

Season
 Most Valuable Player (Andrew Gaze Trophy): Brian Conklin, Townsville Crocodiles
 Rookie of the Year: Angus Brandt, Sydney Kings
 Best Defensive Player: Damian Martin, Perth Wildcats
 Best Sixth Man: Cameron Tragardh, Cairns Taipans
 Most Improved Player: Todd Blanchfield, Townsville Crocodiles
 Coach of the Year (Lindsay Gaze Trophy): Aaron Fearne, Cairns Taipans
 Referee of the Year: Michael Aylen
 All-NBL First Team:
 Cedric Jackson – New Zealand Breakers
 Scottie Wilbekin – Cairns Taipans
 Josh Childress – Sydney Kings
 Brock Motum – Adelaide 36ers
 Brian Conklin – Townsville Crocodiles
 All-NBL Second Team:
 Jamar Wilson – Adelaide 36ers
 Jordan McRae – Melbourne United
 Todd Blanchfield – Townsville Crocodiles
 Ekene Ibekwe – New Zealand Breakers
 Matthew Knight – Perth Wildcats

Finals
 Grand Final Series MVP (Larry Sengstock Medal): Cedric Jackson, New Zealand Breakers

References

 
Australia,NBL
2014–15 in Australian basketball
2015 in New Zealand basketball
2014 in New Zealand basketball